Kuyucak is a village in the Dodurga District of Çorum Province in Turkey. Its population is 96 (2022).

References

Villages in Dodurga District